Yip Cheuk Man (born 12 October 2001) is a Hong Kong professional footballer who plays as a defender for Hong Kong Premier League club Resources Capital.

Club career
In August 2019, Yip signed his first professional contract with Hong Kong Premier League club Happy Valley. 

On 19 August 2021, Yip joined  Resources Capital.

References

External links
 Yip Cheuk Man on HKFA

2001 births
Living people
Hong Kong footballers
Association football defenders
Happy Valley AA players
Resources Capital FC players
Hong Kong Premier League players